Gas plant can refer to:

 Dictamnus or "Gas-plant", a flowering plant
 Gas-fired power plant
 Gas turbine power plant
 Gasworks, an industrial plant for the production of flammable gas
 Natural Gas Processing Plant